East Nashville Magnet High School (formerly East Literature Magnet School and commonly referred to as just East) is a public magnet high school located in Nashville, Tennessee. Students were once enrolled through a lottery process, but the school now has open enrollment. In August 2016, the middle school students were relocated two miles away to what used to be Bailey STEM Magnet School before its closure. However, in August 2019, the middle school students were returned to the junior high building.

History 
The then-East Literature Magnet School opened in August 1993 inside the campus of East Middle School. The school now occupies the entire campus of the former East Nashville High and East Nashville Junior High Schools. In September 2005, the new campus was dedicated, and the completion of renovation of buildings 'A' and 'B' were celebrated. The school now has separate middle and high school facilities. East became a Paideia curriculum school in 2010. The Paideia philosophy celebrates the fundamental notion that to be fully educated is a lifelong adventure that only begins with an individual's formal schooling. The school name was changed to East Nashville Magnet School in mid-2012.

Academics 
Nearly every course offered at East is an honors course, meaning that the teaching is fast-paced, and students are given three extra credit points at the end of each semester. The school also offers many AP courses, including AP Psychology, Art History, Literature and Composition, Physics, and Calculus. Because of the Paideia philosophy the school maintains, students must take part in a class seminar once a month. It ranks as a top high school in Davidson County. The school has met NCLB benchmarks every year.

Sports 
East Magnet offers sports such as soccer, football, basketball, wrestling, volleyball, tennis, bowling, golf, football, track and field, softball, baseball, cheerleading, and cross country. The school has enjoyed a significant amount of success in athletics during recent years. The boys' basketball team has two state runner's up trophies from 2011 and 2014. Girls' basketball became the first East team since the school's reopening to win a state title with a championship in 2016. The girls' track team has also become one of the most successful programs in Tennessee with state championships in 2017, 2018 and 2019 along with state runner's up in 2010, 2015 and 2016.

Principals 
1997 – 1999: Tom Ward
1999 – 2003: Kaye Schnieder
2003 – 2009: Frances Stewart
2009 – 2018: Stephen Ball
2018 – 2022: Jamie Jenkins
2022 – present: Myra Taylor

Notable alumni

 Bill Boner, 1963, the third Mayor of Metropolitan Nashville-Davidson County; U.S. Congressional Representative (5th District of Tennessee)
 Richard Fulton, 1946, second mayor of the Metropolitan Government of Nashville and Davidson County; U.S. Congressional Representative (5th District of Tennessee); Tennessee state Senator
 Hugh Mott, U.S. Army soldier; captured the Bridge at Remagen, Germany; served as Adjutant General, State of Tennessee, 1968-1971; Chief of Police, Nashville, 1971–1974
 Jacob Phillips, 2016, American Football linebacker for Cleveland Browns
 Bill Porter, 1949, American audio engineer credited with helping shape the Nashville sound
 Frank Sutton, 1941, American actor best remembered for his role as Gunnery Sergeant Vince Carter on the CBS television series Gomer Pyle, U.S.M.C.
 Oprah Winfrey, 1971, American media proprietor, talk show host, actress, producer, and philanthropist

References

External links 
 

Public high schools in Tennessee
Schools in Nashville, Tennessee
Magnet schools in Tennessee
Public middle schools in Tennessee
1993 establishments in Tennessee